The Bob Hope British Classic was the original and most often used name of a European Tour golf tournament which was played in England every year but one from 1980 to 1991. It had six different names in total. The English born American entertainer Bob Hope was one of the most prominent celebrity friends of golf, and is a member of the World Golf Hall of Fame. All of the tournaments except the first and the last were played at Moor Park Golf Club in Hertfordshire, just to the north of London. The best known winner was the German future World Number 1 Bernhard Langer. In 1991 the prize fund was £252,370, which was below average for a European Tour event at that time.

Winners

Notes

References

External links
Coverage on the European Tour's official site

Golf tournaments in England
Former European Tour events
Celebrity competitions
Sport in Hertfordshire
Recurring sporting events established in 1980
Recurring events disestablished in 1991
1980 establishments in England
1991 disestablishments in England
Defunct sports competitions in the United Kingdom
Bob Hope